Edward Keane may refer to:

Edward Keane (British Army officer) (1785–1866), colonel who served during Napoleonic Wars
Edward Vivien Harvey Keane (1844–1904), Australian engineer, businessman and politician
Edward Keane (actor) (1884–1959), American bit part performer in hundreds of films